Tuner may refer to someone or something which adjusts or configures a mechanical, electronic, or musical device.

Electronic 

 Antenna tuner, a device to adjust the resonance frequency of an antenna or transmission line
 ATSC tuner, a device that receives digital television broadcasts
 Tuner (radio), a module or device which separates out one channel from low-amplitude radio-frequency signals for further processing
 TV tuner card, a device that allows reception of television on a computer
 TV gateway, or network TV tuner, a device that receives digital television broadcasts and streams them over an IP network

Musical 

 Electronic tuner, a device used by musicians and technicians to measure the pitch of a musical instrument to adjust or correct the input signal to the desired pitch
 Tuning mechanisms for stringed instruments, such as tuning pegs, tuning pins, tuning levers, & konso
 Machine head, a flat handle for the worm gear on a string instrument upon which a string is wound
 Tuner (band), an electronic rock duo consisting of Pat Mastelotto and Markus Reuter

Mechanical 

 Tuner (car), a customized car or hot-rod

See also 
 
 
 Microtuner
 Tuna (disambiguation)
 Tuning (disambiguation)